The siege of Kawagoe is the name of two sieges of Kawagoe Castle.

Siege of Kawagoe (1537)
Siege of Kawagoe (1545)